John Noonan may refer to:
 John T. Noonan Jr., American judge
 John Noonan (analyst)
 John Gerard Noonan, American bishop
 John Ford Noonan, American actor, playwright, and screenwriter
 John Noonan (bowls)